George Pater Madden (March 6, 1887 – June 11, 1977) was an American lawyer and politician.

Madden was born in Waseca, Waseca County, Minnesota. He lived in Waseca, Minnesota and practiced law. Madden served in the Minnesota House of Representatives in 1935 and 1936.

References

1887 births
1977 deaths
People from Waseca, Minnesota
Minnesota lawyers
Members of the Minnesota House of Representatives